Bruce MacDowell Maggs is an American computer scientist and professor at Duke University whose research interests include computer networks, distributed systems, and computer security. He was a founding employee and served as vice president for Research and Development for Akamai Technologies. He is currently the Director of Engineering at Emerald Innovations, Inc.

Biography 
Maggs earned his B.S. (1985), M.S (1986)., and Ph.D. (1989) from the Massachusetts Institute of Technology. After graduating, he worked for NEC Research Institute as a research scientist.

In 1994, he joined the Computer Science department at Carnegie Mellon University, rising to the rank of full professor with tenure.

In 1998, Maggs took three semesters off of teaching to become a founding employee of the then-startup Akamai Technologies (Nasdaq: AKAM). While at Akamai, he became Vice President of Research and Development. He currently serves as Vice President of Research for the company.

From 1998 to 1999, Maggs was on the faculty of Massachusetts Institute of Technology as a Visiting Associate Professor.

In 2007, Maggs joined the faculty of Duke University, where he is currently the Pelham Wilder Professor of Computer Science. He holds a dual appointment to the Electrical Engineering department of Duke's Pratt School of Engineering.

He is currently on leave from Duke University to serve as the Director of Engineering at Emerald Innovations, Inc.

Personal life
Bruce Maggs is the brother of Federal Judge Gregory E. Maggs.

Other achievements
Apart from leading the early engineering efforts for Akamai, Maggs was a co-creator of Avatar, a popular early multiplayer online game developed at the University of Illinois in the late 1970s.

Recognition
Maggs was elected as an ACM Fellow in 2018 for "contributions to the development of content distribution networks and the theory of computer networks".

References

External links
 Bruce Maggs's Homepage
 Bruce Maggs's Publications on DBLP
 An Interview with Bruce Maggs, vice-president for R&D at Akamai Tech - Mihai Budiu, Netreport, March 2001

Carnegie Mellon University faculty
Living people
Year of birth missing (living people)
Duke University faculty
Fellows of the Association for Computing Machinery